He Jing De (born April 23, 1978) is a former competitive wushu taolu athlete and stuntman originally from China. He was a member of the Beijing Wushu Team, an original member of Cirque du Soleil's KA, and a renowned athlete representing Hong Kong. He is a two-time world champion and medalist at the Asian Games and the East Asian Games, and is especially remembered for his unique wushu style.

Career
In 1994, He was recruited by Wu Bin to join the Beijing Wushu Team and achieved success in various disciplines, including a bronze medal victory in shuangdao at the 1997 National Games of China. After this major competition, the Beijing Wushu Team went on various international tours, and He had the chance to perform and compete internationally. After winning the bronze medal in the men's daoshu and gunshu combined event at the 2001 National Games of China, he retired from competitive wushu.

In 2003, He along with his wife Lo Nga Ching moved to Canada, then to the United States, to become members of Cirque du Soleil's Kà. He was joined by fellow retired Beijing Wushu Team members Li Jing and Jian Zengjiao. He also would spend time teaching wushu in Los Angeles and working as a fight choreographer.

In 2005, He moved to Hong Kong and became a member of the Hong Kong wushu team. His first major international appearance was at the 2006 Asian Games in Doha, Qatar, and lost the bronze medal position by 0.05 in men's nanquan. After not seeing success in the 2007 World Wushu Championships in Beijing, China, he appeared at the 2009 World Wushu Championships in Toronto, Canada, and became a world champion in nangun in addition to winning two more medals. Shortly after, He won the gold medal in men's nanquan at the 2009 East Asian Games in Hong Kong. The following year, he was the silver medalist in men's nanquan at the 2010 World Combat Games in Beijing, China. Later that year, he won the silver medal in men's nanquan at the 2010 Asian Games in Guangzhou, China. As his last competition, he competed in the 2011 World Wushu Championships in Ankara, Turkey, and was once again a world champion in nangun as well as a double silver medalist in nanquan and nandao.

Personal life
He is married to Lo Nga-ching, a two-time world champion and double silver medalist at the East Asian Games. They have two kids and teach wushu in Hong Kong. One of their children, Jada He, is a two time gold medalist at the World Junior Wushu Championships.

Awards
 Outstanding Athlete of Hong Kong (香港傑出運動員): 2012

See also
 List of Asian Games medalists in wushu

References

1978 births
American wushu practitioners
Asian Games medalists in wushu
Asian Games silver medalists for Hong Kong
Chinese expatriates in Hong Kong
Chinese expatriates in the United States
Chinese wushu practitioners
Cirque du Soleil performers
Hong Kong wushu practitioners
living people
medalists at the 2010 Asian Games
wushu practitioners at the 2006 Asian Games
wushu practitioners at the 2010 Asian Games